The Pittsburgh Pirates are members of Major League Baseball (MLB); they have employed sportscasters to provide play-by-play and color commentary during games broadcast over the radio and on television.

On August 5, 1921, Pittsburgh hosted the first baseball game broadcast over the radio. Harold Arlin, a foreman at Westinghouse, announced the game over KDKA from a box seat next to the first base dugout at Forbes Field. Throughout the 1920s and 1930s "occasional" games would be broadcast, until Rosey Rowswell became the first "Voice of the Pirates" in 1936. While most of Roswell's early broadcasts were solo, he was joined by Pirates' co-owner Bing Crosby and his successor Bob Prince for games. Prince took over as lead broadcaster in 1955 and held the position over the next 20 seasons. Prince gained a reputation for giving players nicknames and inventing catchphrases to describe the game; he was inducted into the National Baseball Hall of Fame and Museum in August 1986. After the Pirates fired Bob Prince and his sidekick Nellie King after the 1975 season, they hired Milo Hamilton away from Atlanta to be the lead broadcaster and brought Lanny Frattare from their minor league affiliate to be the second announcer. After Hamilton left after the 1979 season, Frattare held the position for 29 years—the longest tenure of any Pirates' broadcaster. Upon Frattare's retirement after the 2008 season, Greg Brown took over the role as lead broadcaster. Multiple people have held temporary positions as broadcasters, including former players Don Hoak, Dave Giusti, Willie Stargell, and Pittsburgh Penguins' broadcaster Mike Lange.

WWSW-FM broadcast Pirates' games on the radio during the 1940s and 1950s until KDKA became the franchise's flagship station in 1955. In 2006, the Pirates switched to WPGB in an attempt to reach younger age brackets; under the contract WPGB carried Pirates' games though the 2011 season.  Starting with the 2012 season, KDKA-FM took over as the flagship station of the Pirates Radio Network. As of 2016, the Pirates Radio Network has stations located in Pennsylvania, West Virginia, Ohio and Maryland.

TV & radio broadcasters

Footnotes
 Each year is linked to an article about that particular MLB season.

See also

List of current Major League Baseball announcers

Notes

References

External links
Official Pittsburgh Pirates Broadcasting page

Pittsburgh Pirates
 
CBS Radio Sports
Westinghouse Broadcasting
Prime Sports
Fox Sports Networks
AT&T SportsNet
Broadcasters